Low Prussian, sometimes known simply as Prussian (Preußisch), is a moribund dialect of East Low German that developed in East Prussia. Low Prussian was spoken in East and West Prussia and Danzig up to 1945. In Danzig it formed the particular city dialect of Danzig German. It developed on a Baltic substrate through the influx of Dutch- and Low German-speaking immigrants. It supplanted Old Prussian, which became extinct in the 18th century.

Simon Dach's poem Anke van Tharaw was written in Low Prussian.

Classification

Low Prussian is a Low German dialect formerly spoken in Prussia. It is separated from its only adjacent German dialect, High Prussian, by the Benrath line and the Uerdingen line, the latter dialect being Central German. This was once one of the, if not the hardest linguistic border within the German dialects.

Plautdietsch, a Low German variety, is included within Low Prussian by some observers. Excluding Plautdietsch, Low Prussian can be considered moribund due to the evacuation and forced expulsion of Germans from East Prussia after World War II. Plautdietsch, however, has several thousand speakers throughout the world, most notably in South America, Canada and Germany.

History

Fate after 1945
Almost all Low Prussian speakers were evacuated or expelled from Prussia after 1945. Since the expellees scattered throughout Western Germany the dialects are now moribund. Most of the Low Prussian speakers not expelled after World War II relocated from Poland to Western Germany in the 1970s and 1980s and from Russia in the 1990s as so-called late repatriates. Today, the language is almost extinct, as its use is restricted to communication within the family and gatherings of expellees, where they are spoken out of nostalgia. In Poland, the language of the few non-displaced people was subjected to severe repression after 1945, which meant that the active use of the language was even lower than in Germany. In both countries, the High Prussian dialects were not transmitted to the next generation, therefore, few elderly speakers remain. The German minority in Poland, recognized since 1991, uses Standard German.

Common Prussian features 
It shares some features with High Prussian, differentiating it from other Eastern Low German dialects.

Those Borussisms are:
 Loss of /-n/ in infinitives (mache for Standard German , "to make");
 retention of the prefix //ge-// in the participe perfect passive (compare Meckelenburg German  to Low Prussian he is jelopen);
 delabialization (Kenig, Brieder, Fraide, Kraiter -  ("king"),  ("brothers"),  ("friends"),  ("weed"));
 nuscht instead of Standard German  ("nothing"); and

Vocabulary 
According to one summary of Low German dialects, words very characteristic of Low Prussian are doa ('dor', there), joa ('jo', yes), goah ('goh', go) and noa ('nober', neighbor), which feature the diphthong "oa" instead of the usual "o" or "a". Further diphthong digressions include such examples as "eu" (pronounced as ei as in Heiser ('Häuser', houses)), as well as "ei" (pronounced as ee as in Beene ('Beine', legs)). Betcke also notes the tendency to transform the long "u" with an umlaut as in dü ('du', you), nü ('nun', now) and Ühr ('Uhr', watch). 

The dialect is also marked by a loan of High German-like words, such as zwei ('twee', two).  Words are often shortened, in a manner similar to that of the neighboring East Pomeranian dialect, giving beet (beten, little bit) and baakove ('bakåben', bake oven).

Some observers argue that it resembles Dutch and Flemish because of these features. Low Prussian also has a number of words in common with Plautdietsch, such as Klemp (cow), Klopps (lump, ball of earth), and Tsoagel (tail).

Some other words  are:

 Boffke - boy, lad
 dätsch - dumb
 Dubs - bum
 Gnaschel - little child
 jankere - yearn
 Kobbel - mare
 Pungel - pouch
 schabbere - talk
 Schischke - pine-cone
 Schucke - potato(es)

Varieties 
 Vistulan (Dialekt des Weichselgebietes), around Danzig (Gdańsk)
 Werdersch (Mundart der Weichselwerder)
 Nehrungisch (Mundart der Frischen Nehrung und der Danziger Nehrung), around the Vistula Lagoon
 Elbingian (Mundart der Elbinger Höhe), around Elbing (Elbląg)
 Mundart des Kürzungsgebiet(e)s or Kürzungsgebietsmundart, around Braunsberg (Braniewo) and Frombork
 Westkäslausch, around Mehlsack (Pieniężno)
 Ostkäslausch, around Rößel (Reszel)
 Natangian (Natangisch-Bartisch), around Bartenstein (Bartoszyce)
 Samlandic, around Pillau (Baltiysk), Königsberg (Kaliningrad), Labiau (Polessk) and Wehlau (Znamensk)
 Eastern Low Prussian (Mundart des Ostgebietes), around Insterburg (Chernyakhovsk), Memel (Klaipėda) and Tilsit (Sovetsk)

Low and Old Prussian 
After the assimilation of the Old Prussians, many Old Prussian words were preserved within the Low Prussian dialect.

Low Prussian and Lithuanian 
After the migration of Lithuanians in the 15th century, many Lithuanian loanwords appeared in the Low Prussian dialect.

Sample text: Klingelschleede 
The writer Erminia von Olfers-Batocki (1876-1954) from Natangia wrote the following poem in Low Prussian:

See also 
 German dialects
 High Prussian
 Old Prussian
 Plautdietsch

References

Bibliography
 Bauer, Gerhard: Baltismen im ostpreußischen Deutsch: Hermann Frischbiers „Preussisches Wörterbuch“ als volkskundliche Quelle. In: Annaberger Annalen, Nr. 13, 2005, p. 5-82.
 Mitzka, Walther. Grundzüge nordostdeutscher Sprachgeschichte. (= DDG 59) Marburg (Elwert) 1959
 Riemann, Erhard. Die preußische Sprachlandschaft. In: Festschrift für Friedrich von Zahn Bd. 2   Köln/Wien 1971, 1-34
 Riemann, Erhard (Hrsg.). Preußisches Wörterbuch. Bd. 1, Lf. 1. Neumünster (Wachholtz) 1974
 Ziesemer, Walther. Die ostpreußischen Mundarten. Proben und Darstellungen. Breslau 2005

External links

East Prussia
German dialects
 
Languages of Germany